Judy Radul (born in 1962 in Lillooet, British Columbia) is a Canadian multidisciplinary artist, writer and educator. She is known for her performance art and media installations, as well as her critical writing.

Biography
She has exhibited her work around the world, and recently participated in the Deutscher Akademischer Austauschdienst program in Berlin. She is currently a professor at Simon Fraser University, in the School for Contemporary Arts and is represented by the Catriona Jeffries Gallery.

She received her BA in 1990 in Fine and Performing Arts from Simon Fraser University, British Columbia, and her M.F.A. in 2000 (Visual and Media Arts) from Bard College, New York.

Her teaching career includes;
 Professor, Simon Fraser University, [?]-present;
 [Faculty/Guest Lecturer], The Banff Centre, 2010
 Assistant Professor, Simon Fraser University, 2000–[?];
 Instructor, Simon Fraser University, 1999-2000;
 Sessional Instructor, Emily Carr Institute of Art and Design, 1994-1999;

Radul's practice since the 1980s includes performance art, creative and critical writing, sound works, photography, film, video and multimedia installations. She has contributed significantly to Canadian art institutions such as the Banff Centre and the Western Front. She has also been closely involved with The Kootenay School of Writing, a Vancouver-based writers' collective.

Notable exhibitions
 Radul's recent work is the World Rehearsal Court. According to the Morris and Helen Belkin Art Gallery website:

The work serves as an example of Radul's long-running interest in art, technology and the law. In explicitly identifying the performative aspects of the courtroom, the World Rehearsal Court questions the objective and immutable truth that the court process purports to uncover.

 Radul also exhibited at the 2014 Berlin Biennale

Other selected exhibitions and performances
 Catriona Jeffries, Vancouver, 2018.
Contour Biennale 8, Mechelen, 2017.
Witte de With Center for Contemporary Art, Rotterdam, 2017
V-A-C Foundation at the GULAG History State Museum, Moscow, 2017
Nicaragua Biennale X, 2016.
Agnes Etherington Art Centre, Kingston, Ontario, 2015.
8th Berlin Biennale, 2014.
Daadgalerie, Berlin, 2013.
Catriona Jeffries, Vancouver, 2011.
Seoul Biennale of Media Art, 2010.
General Foundation, Vienna, 2010.
 Morris and Helen Belkin Gallery, Vancouver, BC, 2009.
 Vancouver Art Gallery, Vancouver BC, 2005.
 Presentation House Gallery, North Vancouver, BC, 2005.
 Kunsthaus Graz, Austria, 2004.
 Canadian Cultural Centre, Paris, 2004.
 Dazibao centre de photographies actuelles, Montreal, 2004.
 Power Plant Contemporary Art Gallery, Toronto, 2003.
 YYZ Gallery, Toronto, 2003.

Honours 
 VIVA award (1999), Jack and Doris Shadbolt Foundation for the Visual Arts.
City of Vancouver Mayor's Arts Award for Visual Arts (2017)

References

Further reading
 Radul, Judy. People things enter exit. North Vancouver, BC: Presentation House Gallery, c2010. .
 Judy Radul, Curriculum Vitae. Artist's File, Vancouver Art Gallery Library, Vancouver, B.C. (See Canadian Artists Files at the Vancouver Art Gallery for further information.)

External links 
 artist website

1962 births
Living people
Canadian multimedia artists
Canadian women non-fiction writers
Artists from British Columbia
Writers from British Columbia
Simon Fraser University alumni
Academic staff of Simon Fraser University
Bard College alumni
Canadian art educators
Canadian women artists
Canadian installation artists
People from Lillooet